Marlowe House is a Metropolitan Police building in Sidcup, London, built in 1966. Along with administrative areas, since 19 March 2012 its ground floor has also housed Sidcup's police station. A refurbishment was completed in 2020 and the Metropolitan Police Museum reopened there in autumn 2022.

References

Buildings and structures completed in 1966
Buildings and structures in Sidcup
Metropolitan Police administrative buildings
Metropolitan Police stations